The 2009 Eastern Michigan Eagles football team represented Eastern Michigan University in the 2009 NCAA Division I FBS football season.  Eastern Michigan competed as a member of the Mid-American Conference (MAC) West Division and played their home games in Rynearson Stadium.

Following the firing of Jeff Genyk during the 2008 season, Eastern Michigan hired Ron English, who had formerly been the defensive coordinator at the University of Michigan and the University of Louisville, as the team's head coach. The coaching change initially brought excitement to the program, as English hired a new staff, including former University of Michigan, New York Giants, and Oakland Raiders running back Tyrone Wheatley, and replaced Genyk's spread offense with a pro-style offense.

However, the change in offense proved difficult for senior quarterback Andy Schmitt, and he was largely ineffective in the first several games of the season. In the second game of the year, the Eagles traveled to Northwestern, and after trailing 21–0 in the second quarter, they tied the game at 24 with 2 minutes left, before Northwestern kicked a game-winning field goal in the closing seconds. The following week, they had another trip just across the county to play Michigan. Similar to their 2006 game at Michigan State, they played a very competitive first half, only trailing by one score. But like many times before, they couldn't put two good halves together. In the second half, the Eagles were outscored 21–0 and Andy Schmitt suffered a season-ending knee injury.

The rest of the season they used former starting quarterback Kyle McMahon, and freshman Alex Gillet. Eastern scored no more than 12 points in any of the next three games, including a 56–8 loss at Central Michigan. The week after that, they nearly beat Ball State who was also winless at the time. The difference was a safety in the fourth quarter. Next, they had one more non-conference game as they traveled to Arkansas. This game was the opposite of the Michigan game — bad first half, good second half. They were down 42–0 before eventually losing 63–27. For the rest of the year, they were only close in the finale at Akron, losing by 7. In previous years, Eastern was able to get at least a few wins because of a high scoring offense. Schmitt's injury ended that, and their defense was among the worst in the nation. Eastern gave up 3,321 rushing yards (276.8 per game), more than any other team in the nation, which was their downfall. They statistically appeared to have one of the best passing defenses, allowing 150.5 passing yards per game, second only to Air Force, but this was mostly an illusion. Everyone knew they couldn't stop the run, so opponents just didn't call many pass plays.

Eastern finished the season without a win, their first winless season since 1981. The Eagles were one of two winless FBS teams (Western Kentucky was the other).

Recruiting

Schedule

Roster

Coaching staff

Game summaries

Army

Scoring Summary

1st Quarter
 06:12 ARMY – Mealy 6-yard run (Campbell kick failed) 6–0 ARMY

2nd Quarter
 05:56 ARMY – Carter 12-yard run (Campbell kick) 13–0 ARMY

3rd Quarter

4th Quarter
 13:58 EMU – Hunter 20-yard pass from Schmitt (Carithers kick) 13–7 ARMY
 10:22 ARMY – Ehie 10-yard run (Smith rush) 21–7 ARMY
 06:53 ARMY – Ehie 5-yard run (Campbell kick failed) 27–7 ARMY
 03:31 EMU – Priest 1-yard run (Carithers kick) 27–14 ARMY

Northwestern

Scoring Summary

1st Quarter
 06:38 NU Simmons 1-yard run (Demos kick) 0–7 NU

2nd Quarter
 12:33 NU Simmons 14-yard run (Demos kick) 0–14 NU
 09:08 NU Johnson 70-yard interception return (Demos kick) 0–21 NU
 03:32 EMU Carithers 33-yard field goal 3–21 NU

3rd Quarter
 04:33 EMU Priest 1-yard run (Carithers kick) 10–21 NU

4th Quarter
 12:57 NU Demos 20-yard field goal 10–24 NU
 09:55 EMU Stone 25-yard pass from Schmitt (Carithers kick) 17–24 NU
 02:40 EMU Blevins 3-yard run (Carithers kick) 24–24
 00:06 NU Demos 49-yard field goal 24–27 NU

Michigan

Scoring Summary

1st Quarter
 10:46 MICH Olesnavage 37-yard field goal 0–3 MICH
 05:32 EMU Carithers 43-yard field goal 3–3
 02:30 MICH Brown 9-yard run (Olesnavage kick) 3–10 MICH

2nd Quarter
 11:16 EMU Schmitt 11-yard run (Carithers kick) 10–10
 09:20 MICH Shaw 5-yard run (Olesnavage kick) 10–17 MICH
 07:15 MICH Brown 90-yard run (Olesnavage kick) 10–24 MICH
 02:05 EMU Priest 5-yard run (Carithers kick) 17–24 MICH

3rd Quarter
 04:47 MICH Odoms 13-yard run (Olesnavage kick) 17–31 MICH
 03:06 MICH Robinson 13-yard run (Olesnavage kick) 17–38 MICH

4th Quarter
 07:14 MICH Robinson 36-yard run (Olesnavage kick) 17–45 MICH

Temple

Central Michigan

Scoring Summary

1st Quarter
 08:51 CMU Brown 70-yard pass from LeFevour (Aguila kick) 0–7 CMU
 03:58 CMU LeFevour 1-yard run (Aguila kick) 0–14 CMU

2nd Quarter
 12:33 CMU LeFevour 1-yard run (Aguila kick) 0–21 CMU
 02:51 CMU Brown 75-yard punt return (Aguila kick) 0–28 CMU
 00:18 CMU Schroeder 11-yard pass from LeFevour (Aguila kick) 0–35 CMU

3rd Quarter
 12:50 CMU Poblah 25-yard pass from LeFevour (Aguila kick) 0–42 CMU
 01:57 CMU LeFevour 5-yard run (Aguila kick) 0–49 CMU

4th Quarter
 11:25 EMU Welch 1-yard run (Gillett rush) 8–49 CMU
 07:36 CMU Volny 3-yard run (Aguila kick) 8–56 CMU

Kent State

Ball State

Scoring Summary

1st Quarter
 9:08 EMU Thayer 3-yard pass from McMahon (Carithers kick) 0–7 EMU
 4:52 BSU Sykes 51-yard run (Schott kick blocked) 6–7 EMU

2nd Quarter
 10:59 EMU Carithers 20-yard field goal 6–10 EMU
 9:23 EMU Welch 12-yard run (Carithers kick) 6–17 EMU
 6:37 EMU Carithers 26-yard field goal 6–20 EMU
 4:06 BSU Lewis 48-yard run (Schott kick) 13–20 EMU

3rd Quarter
 10:44 EMU White 10-yard run (Carithers kick) 13–27 EMU
 6:37 BSU Sykes 6-yard run (Schott kick) 20–27 EMU
 5:33 BSU Team Safety 22–27 EMU
 1:47 BSU Sykes 37-yard run (Schott kick) 29–27 BSU

Arkansas

Scoring Summary

1st Quarter
 10:42 AR Davis 36-yard run (Tejada kick) 0–7 AR
 6:42 AR Green 3-yard run (Tejada kick) 0–14 AR
 4:02 AR Burton 50-yard interception return (Tejada kick) 0–21 AR

2nd Quarter
 12:21 AR Adams 10-yard pass from Mallett (Tejada kick) 0–28 AR
 4:10 AR Green 99-yard run (Tejada kick) 0–35 AR
 1:38 AR Adams 78-yard pass from Mallet (Tejada kick) 0–42 AR

3rd Quarter
 12:38 AR Armbrust 1-yard blocked punt return (Tejada kick) 0–49 AR
 9:30 EMU Thayer 8-yard pass from McMahon (Carithers kick failed) 6–49 AR
 5:58 EMU Thomas 77-yard pass from McMahon (Carithers kick) 13–49 AR
 4:30 AR Davis 4-yard run (Tejada kick) 13–56 AR
 2:50 EMU Bonner 32-yard pass from McMahon (Carithers kick) 20–56 AR
 0:18 AR Miller 16-yard pass from Mallet (Tejada kick) 20–63 AR

4th Quarter
 2:14 EMU Priest 10-yard run (Carithers kick) 27–63 AR

Northern Illinois

Western Michigan

Toledo

Akron

References

Eastern Michigan
Eastern Michigan Eagles football seasons
College football winless seasons
Eastern Michigan Eagles football